German submarine U-714 was a Type VIIC U-boat Nazi Germany's Kriegsmarine built for service during World War II. She was laid down on 29 December 1941 by H. C. Stülcken Sohn at Hamburg and commissioned on 10 February 1943. She was commanded throughout her career by Oberleutnant zur See Hans-Joachim Schwebcke.

Design
German Type VIIC submarines were preceded by the shorter Type VIIB submarines. U-714 had a displacement of  when at the surface and  while submerged. She had two shafts and two  propellers.

U-714 was fitted with five  torpedo tubes (four fitted at the bow and one at the stern), fourteen torpedoes, one  SK C/35 naval gun, 220 rounds, and two twin  C/30 anti-aircraft guns. The boat had a complement of between forty-four and sixty.

Fate
She was sunk on 14 March 1945 near Eyemouth in the Firth of Forth at position  by depth charges from the South African frigate HMSAS Natal.  was granted a share of the credit for this kill as well. She had a complement of 50 crew, and when she sank, all of her crew died. She was designated as a protected place under the Protection of Military Remains Act 1986 in 2008.

Wolfpacks
U-714 took part in six wolfpacks, namely:
 Körner (30 October – 2 November 1943) 
 Tirpitz 1 (2 – 8 November 1943) 
 Eisenhart 2 (9 – 15 November 1943) 
 Schill 3 (18 – 22 November 1943) 
 Weddigen (22 – 30 November 1943) 
 Igel 1 (3 – 17 February 1944)

Summary of raiding history

References

Notes

Citations

Bibliography

External links
 Images of U714 on Periscope Publishing website

 SI 2008/0950 Designation under the Protection of Military Remains Act 1986

German Type VIIC submarines
U-boats commissioned in 1943
U-boats sunk in 1945
World War II submarines of Germany
World War II shipwrecks in the English Channel
Protected Wrecks of Scotland
1942 ships
Ships built in Hamburg
U-boats sunk by depth charges
U-boats sunk by British warships
U-boats sunk by South African warships
Ships lost with all hands
Maritime incidents in March 1945
1945 in Scotland
History of the Scottish Borders